Akeli Mat Jaiyo (English: Don't go alone) is a 1963 Bollywood film starring Rajendra Kumar and Meena Kumari.

Cast
 Rajendra Kumar as Prince Amardeep/Rajendrakumar
 Meena Kumari as Seema
 Agha as Ram Singh
 Ruby Mayer as Queen
 Leela Mishra as Rajendra's mother
 Minoo Mumtaz as Shobha

Soundtrack
All songs were composed by Madan Mohan and written by Majrooh Sultanpuri.

References

External links

1963 films
1960s Hindi-language films
Films scored by Madan Mohan